William Alison Anders (born 17 October 1933) is a retired United States Air Force (USAF) major general, former electrical engineer, nuclear engineer, NASA astronaut, and businessman. In December 1968, he was a member of the crew of Apollo 8, the first three people to leave low Earth orbit and travel to the Moon. Along with fellow astronauts Frank Borman and Jim Lovell, Anders circled the Moon ten times, and broadcast live images and commentary back to Earth. During one of the mission's lunar orbits, he took the iconic Earthrise photograph.

A graduate of the United States Naval Academy in Annapolis, Maryland, Anders was commissioned a second lieutenant in the United States Air Force (USAF) in 1955, and became a fighter pilot flying Northrop F-89 Scorpions equipped with MB-1 nuclear-tipped air-to-air missiles. He hoped to study aeronautical engineering through the Air Force Institute of Technology (AFIT) at Wright-Patterson Air Force Base in Ohio, but the Aircraft Nuclear Propulsion program was ongoing, and he had to study nuclear engineering instead. He graduated from the AFIT in 1962 with a Master of Science degree in nuclear engineering, and was sent to the Air Force Weapons Laboratory at Kirtland Air Force Base in New Mexico, where he managed the technical aspects of the USAF nuclear power reactor programs.

Anders was the executive secretary of the National Aeronautics and Space Council from 1969 to 1973, a commissioner of the Atomic Energy Commission from 1973 to 1975, and chairman of the Nuclear Regulatory Commission from 1975 to 1976. He then became the Ambassador to Norway from 1976 to 1977. In September 1977, he joined General Electric (GE) as the vice president and general manager of its Nuclear Products Division and became the general manager of the GE Aircraft Equipment Division in 1980. He left GE to join Textron as executive vice president for aerospace, and two years later became senior executive vice president for operations. During his time in the Civil Service, Anders had remained in the USAF as a reservist and had retained his active flight status. He retired from the reserves as a major general in 1988. In 1990, he became vice chairman of General Dynamics, and on 1 January 1991 its chairman and CEO. He retired as CEO in 1993, and as chairman in May 1994.

Early life 
William Alison Anders was born in Hong Kong on 17 October 1933, the son of Arthur F. Anders, a United States Navy lieutenant, and his wife Muriel . The family relocated from Hong Kong to Annapolis, Maryland, where his father taught mathematics at the U.S. Naval Postgraduate School. They were then posted to China. In June 1937, the Second Sino-Japanese War erupted and Japan invaded China. In December, his father was serving as the executive officer of the river gunboat  when it was attacked and sunk by Japanese bombers and was wounded in the attack. Anders and his mother fled Nanking before the advancing Japanese forces, taking a train to Canton.

This was ominous, as the river was their only means of escape. In addition to the threat of Japanese aircraft, the river was mined, and there was the danger of being boarded by bandits. Foreigners had to be separated from Chinese people on the boat by barbed wire. They eventually reached the Philippines, where they awaited news of his father. Arthur Anders was rescued by the British and sent to San Diego Naval Hospital to recover from his wounds and a staph infection. He was awarded the Purple Heart and the Navy Cross but was discharged from the Navy due to his wounds. He was recalled to active duty during World War II.

The family returned to the United States, where Anders was active in the Boy Scouts, achieving the organization's second-highest rank, Life Scout. As a teen, Anders attended St. Martin's Academy and Grossmont High School in El Cajon, California. To improve his grades where he could be accepted at the United States Naval Academy in Annapolis, Maryland, Anders was sent to the Boyden School, a military academy prep school in downtown San Diego. He commuted to Boyden by bus from La Mesa, California. The school lay under the flight path into Lindbergh Field and aircraft like the huge Convair B-36 Peacemaker would fly low over the school. He was fascinated with flight and built model aircraft. He graduated from Boyden in 1951.

United States Air Force 
Anders received an appointment to Annapolis, following in the footsteps of his father, who graduated with the Class of 1927. He earned a Bachelor of Science degree in electrical engineering in 1955. Part of the course was orientation cruises during which midshipmen could experience life at sea. A cruise on board an aircraft carrier convinced him that he did not want to become a naval aviator; there were too many fatal accidents. Upon graduation in 1955, he chose to be commissioned a second lieutenant in the United States Air Force (USAF). While at Annapolis he met Valerie Elizabeth Hoard on a blind date. Midshipmen were not allowed to marry, but they were married soon after he graduated. Together, they had six children: Alan (born in 1957), Glen (born in 1958), Gayle (born in 1960), Gregory (born in 1962), Eric (born in 1964), and Diana (born in 1972).

After graduation, Anders reported for flight training, which was conducted in the piston-engine Beechcraft T-34 Mentor and North American T-28 Trojan and then in the jet Lockheed T-33 Shooting Star. After receiving his pilot wings in 1956, he became a fighter pilot with the 84th Fighter-Interceptor Squadron, an all-weather interceptor squadron of the Air Defense Command based at Hamilton Air Force Base in California, flying Northrop F-89 Scorpions equipped with MB-1 nuclear-tipped air-to-air missiles. He then served with the 57th Fighter-Interceptor Squadron in Iceland, where he participated in intercepts of Soviet heavy bombers who at the time were challenging America's air defense borders. After a year there, he returned to the 84th Fighter-Interceptor Squadron at Hamilton, which was now flying the McDonnell F-101 Voodoo.

Anders set his sights on becoming a test pilot. He spoke to Chuck Yeager, who recommended that he first obtain an advanced degree. Anders submitted an application to the Air Force Institute of Technology (AFIT) at Wright-Patterson Air Force Base in Ohio, hoping to study aeronautical engineering, but the Aircraft Nuclear Propulsion program was ongoing, and the AFIT had him study nuclear engineering instead. While there he took a school course in aeronautical engineering at Ohio State University. He graduated from the AFIT with a Master of Science degree in nuclear engineering in 1962. By this time the Aircraft Nuclear Propulsion program had been canceled, so he was assigned to the Air Force Weapons Laboratory at Kirtland Air Force Base in New Mexico, where he was responsible for the technical management of the nuclear power reactor programs.

NASA

Selection and training 
Anders now applied to the USAF Aerospace Research Pilots School (ARPS) for test pilot training. But on 5 June 1963, the National Aeronautics and Space Administration (NASA) announced that it would be recruiting ten to fifteen new astronauts for Project Gemini and Project Apollo, and Anders decided to apply for that too. In two previous astronaut selections, applicants had to be test pilots, but this time it was preferred but not required, making Anders eligible. He was one of the 34 finalists chosen for interviews, and on his birthday, 17 October 1963, he was informed by Mercury Seven astronaut Deke Slayton that he had been accepted as a member of the third group of NASA astronauts. Three days later, Yeager informed him that he had failed to make the cut for the ARPS, but recommended that he apply again the following year.

While at NASA, he became involved in dosimetry, radiation effects, and environmental controls. In September 1966, he was the backup pilot for the Gemini 11 mission, with Neil Armstrong as the backup commander. This would have put him in line to fly a Gemini 13 mission, but no such mission was flown; Project Gemini ended with Gemini 12. Armstrong and Anders then became the first astronauts to fly the Lunar Landing Training Vehicle. The astronauts in his group without test pilot training—Anders, Roger Chaffee, Walter Cunningham, Rusty Schweickart, Gene Cernan and Buzz Aldrin—were assigned to Apollo crews as the lunar module pilot (LMP), the lowest-ranking crew member.

Apollo 8 
On 22 December 1966, Anders was assigned to the third Apollo mission, which was to be commanded by Frank Borman, with command module pilot (CMP) Michael Collins; Neil Armstrong, Jim Lovell and Buzz Aldrin were assigned as their backup crew the following year. Collins was replaced by Lovell in July 1968, after suffering a cervical disc herniation that required surgery to repair. The mission, scheduled for December 1968, was intended to be a second test of the lunar module (LM) in medium Earth orbit, but the delivery of the LM fell behind schedule, and when it arrived at the Kennedy Space Center (KSC) in June 1968, more than a hundred significant defects were discovered. There was no prospect of it being ready to fly in 1968. In August 1968, there were reports, including one from the CIA, that the Soviet Union was planning a crewed lunar orbit mission before the end of the year.

Although the LM would not be ready to fly in December 1968, the Apollo command and service module (CSM) would be, so a CSM-only mission could be flown. It could be sent to the Moon, entering lunar orbit before returning to Earth. Slayton asked James McDivitt, the designated commander of the second mission, if he still wanted to fly it. McDivitt turned it down; his crew had spent a great deal of time preparing to test the LM, and that was what he still wanted to do. When Borman was asked the same question, he answered "yes" without any hesitation. Slayton then decided to swap the crews and spacecraft, so Borman, Lovell and Anders' mission became Apollo 8. Anders was less enthusiastic about being the lunar module pilot of a mission without a lunar module.

According to Borman:

Earthrise 

In December 1968, Anders flew on the Apollo 8 mission, the first mission where humans traveled beyond low Earth orbit, and the first crewed flight to reach and orbit the Moon. When the spacecraft came out from behind the Moon for its fourth pass across the front, the crew witnessed an "Earthrise" for the first time in human history. NASA's Lunar Orbiter 1 had taken the first picture of an Earthrise from the vicinity of the Moon, on 23 August 1966.

Anders saw the Earth emerging from behind the lunar horizon and called in excitement to the others, taking a black-and-white photograph as he did so. Anders asked Lovell for color film and then took Earthrise, which was later picked by Life magazine as one of its hundred photos of the century. Anders stated that the Earthrise photograph "really undercut my religious beliefs. The idea that things rotate around the pope and up there is a big supercomputer wondering whether Billy was a good boy yesterday? It doesn't make any sense. I became a big buddy of Richard Dawkins."
According to Anders:

On conservation of the planet, he said:

It landed just  from the recovery ship, the aircraft carrier . Due to time dilation, he had aged about 300 microseconds more than people back on Earth.

Apollo 11 
The Apollo 11 mission was commanded by Armstrong, with Collins as the CMP and Aldrin as the LMP. The Apollo 8 crew became its backup, but without Borman. Lovell stepped up to become the backup commander, and Anders became the backup CMP, with rookie astronaut Fred Haise as the backup LMP.

Post-NASA career

Government service 
Anders could see that Project Apollo was coming to a close, and felt that his chances of commanding a Moon mission were slim. On 16 May 1969, President Richard M. Nixon nominated him to become the executive secretary of the National Aeronautics and Space Council (NASC). This was the highest government post ever offered to an astronaut up to that time. He was confirmed by the United States Senate on 19 June. The Space Council consisted of the Administrator of NASA, the Chairman of the Atomic Energy Commission (AEC), and the Secretaries of State, Defense, and Transportation, and was chaired by the Vice President. Due to his commitment to the Apollo 11 backup crew, Anders was unable to assume the position until August.

In his new role, Anders was responsible for developing aeronautical and space policy. He worked closely with the Office of Science and Technology (OST) and the Office of Management and Budget (OMB) and became a personal advisor to the OMB director, Caspar Weinberger. Anders worked hard to bridge the gap between OMB and OST on the one hand and NASA on the other. He became increasingly pessimistic about the future of the NASC and the space program generally. He opposed the development of the Space Shuttle, urging instead that NASA concentrate on developing the Skylab space station. He argued that a small Space Shuttle would be a better option than a large one, but the large one was approved because it would involve more jobs in California. Frustrated with the NASC's lack of influence, he recommended in 1972 that it be abolished. This was done on 30 June 1973.

Nixon was impressed by Anders, and wanted to retain him in the administration. On 6 August 1973, he appointed Anders to the five-member AEC. Nixon felt that the commission was dominated by lawyers and he wanted an engineer on it. The chairman of the AEC, Dixie Lee Ray, made Anders the lead commissioner for nuclear and non-nuclear power research and development. He also served as the US chairman of the joint US-Soviet Union nuclear fission and fusion power technology exchange program. He spent much of his time dealing with the AEC's problematic research and development programs, particularly the troubled breeder reactor program.

One issue that had dogged the AEC since its inception was its dual role in both developing nuclear energy and regulating it. The perception that there was a conflict of interest between the two roles became acute with the growth of the nuclear power industry. On 19 January 1975, the commission was split in two, with its research and development responsibilities assumed by the Energy Research and Development Administration (ERDA), and its regulatory ones by the Nuclear Regulatory Commission (NRC). Some 1,970 former employees of the AEC joined the NRC. President Gerald R. Ford appointed Anders as the first chairman of the NRC. He was the only one of the five AEC commissioners to transition to one of the new organizations. Anders made the decision process of the commissioners of the NRC more transparent than that of the AEC. The NRC inherited nuclear safety and environmental compatibility functions from the AEC, but unlike the AEC's regulatory branch, the NRC had its own safety and security research capability, so it was not reliant on the ERDA.

At the completion of his term as NRC chairman, Anders was asked if he would be interested in an ambassadorship. He did not want to, but asked his wife Valerie. She expressed an interest in Norway, based on their trip there during the Apollo 8 world publicity tour. So Anders asked if Norway was available. Lawrence Eagleburger submitted his name for the position. Anders was appointed Ambassador to Norway on 13 April 1976, and held that post until 18 June 1977.

Private sector 
Anders served briefly as a fellow of the American Enterprise Institute. In September 1977, he joined General Electric (GE) as its vice president and general manager of its Nuclear Products Division. Based in San Jose, California, Anders was responsible for the fuel, equipment, and instrumentation used in its boiling-water reactors in San Jose and Wilmington, North Carolina. He also oversaw GE's partnership with Chicago Bridge and Iron, which manufactured large steel pressure vessels in Memphis, Tennessee. In August 1979, GE sent him to Harvard Business School to attend its six-week Advanced Management Program. On 1 January 1980, he became the general manager of the GE Aircraft Equipment Division. From its headquarters in Utica, New York, the division controlled more than 8,500 employees in five locations in northeastern United States. Its products included aircraft flight and weapon control systems, cockpit instruments, aircraft electrical generating systems, airborne radars and data processing systems, electronic countermeasures, space command systems, and aircraft/surface multi-barrel armament systems.

In 1984, Anders left GE to join Textron as its executive vice president for aerospace. Two years later he became senior executive vice president for operations, but Anders did not get along well with the CEO. A perk of the job was that he got to fly Bell helicopters, as Bell was a subsidiary of Textron. During his time in the civil service, Anders had remained in the Air Force as a reservist and had retained his active flight status flying NASA Northrop T-38 Talon aircraft and helicopters, retiring from the reserves as a major general in 1988. He was also a consultant to the US Office of Science and Technology Policy, and a member of the Defense Science Board and the NASA Advisory Council.

Anders became vice chairman of General Dynamics in 1990, and on 1 January 1991, its chairman and CEO. As chairman, he appointed himself as an assistant test pilot for the General Dynamics F-16 Fighting Falcon. He moved corporate headquarters from St. Louis, Missouri, to Falls Church, Virginia, to be closer to its military customers at The Pentagon but then reduced the staff there from 250 to 50. He negotiated a $1 billion settlement over the canceled McDonnell Douglas A-12 Avenger II program, and sold off nearly $3 billion in assets, including the missile systems and Cessna, and sold the military aircraft division to the Lockheed Corporation for $1.5 billion. This reduced the number of employees from 98,600 to around 35,000, and the company's debt from $430 million (equivalent to $ million in ) to $183 million (equivalent to $ million in ). Value was returned to the shareholders in the form of $600 million in dividends. Although annual sales dropped from $10 to $3.5 billion, the value of the company's share price quadrupled. Anders earned over $40 million. He retired as CEO in 1993, and as chairman in May 1994.

In retirement, Anders bought a house on the waterfront in the San Juan Islands. He disliked the winter there so he bought a second dwelling in Point Loma, California. He established the William A. Anders Foundation, a philanthropic organization for educational and environmental issues. He also founded the Heritage Flight Museum in 1996 in Bellingham, Washington, which moved to Skagit Regional Airport in Burlington, Washington, in 2014. The museum was run by his family, with Anders as president, his wife Valerie as secretary, son Greg as vice president, executive director and webmaster, and son Alan as vice president and director of maintenance. Anders was the president and, until 2008, participated in its air shows. From his Air Force career onward, he logged over 8,000 hours of flight time.

Publications

Awards and honors 
 Air Force Distinguished Service Medal
 Air Force Commendation Medal
 NASA Distinguished Service Medal
 Nuclear Regulatory Commission Distinguished Service Medal
 National Geographic Society's Hubbard Medal for Exploration
 Collier, Harmon, Dr. Robert H. Goddard and General Thomas D. White USAF Trophies
 Golden Plate Award of the American Academy of Achievement (1969)
 American Astronautical Society's Flight Achievement Award
 American Defense Preparedness Association's Industry Leadership Award (May 1993)
 In October 2018, the International Astronomical Union named a crater seen in the Anders' photo as "Anders' Earthrise".
 Along with his Apollo 8 crewmembers, Anders received AIAA's Haley Astronautics Award in 1970.

Anders was inducted into the International Space Hall of Fame in 1983, the International Air & Space Hall of Fame in 1990, the U.S. Astronaut Hall of Fame in 1997, and the National Aviation Hall of Fame in 2004. He is a member of Tau Beta Pi National Engineering Honor Society, American Nuclear Society, American Institute of Aeronautics and Astronautics, National Academy of Engineering and Society of Experimental Test Pilots.

In popular culture 

Robert John Burke played Anders in the 1998 HBO miniseries From the Earth to the Moon. Anders appeared as himself in the 2005 documentary Race to the Moon, which was shown as part of the PBS American Experience television series. The film, renamed Earthrise: The First Lunar Voyage in 2013, was about the events that led up to the Apollo 8 mission. He was interviewed in a chapter of the 2015 book No More Worlds to Conquer by Chris Wright. The chapter is roughly evenly split between his life in the Apollo program and his later corporate life. The book's front cover is the Earthrise image. He appeared with fellow astronauts Frank Borman and Jim Lovell on the C-SPAN channel book review, Rocket Men. He confirmed the story that he had fallen asleep while awaiting the Apollo 8 launch.

See also 
 List of spaceflight records
 The Astronaut Monument

Footnotes

Notes

References

External links 

 
 
 American Experience, Race to the Moon 
 Astronauts Reflect on Historic Moon Voyage 50 Years Later

William Anders
1933 births
Living people
1968 in spaceflight
Apollo 8
Air Force Institute of Technology alumni
Aviators from California
American people of Norwegian descent
Ambassadors of the United States to Norway
Apollo program astronauts
Collier Trophy recipients
General Electric people
General Dynamics
Engineers from California
American nuclear engineers
American business executives
Harmon Trophy winners
Hong Kong people
Nuclear Regulatory Commission officials
People from La Mesa, California
Military personnel from California
Recipients of the Air Force Distinguished Service Medal
Recipients of the NASA Distinguished Service Medal
United States Air Force astronauts
United States Air Force generals
United States Astronaut Hall of Fame inductees
United States Naval Academy alumni
Members of the United States National Academy of Engineering
20th-century American businesspeople
American expatriates in Hong Kong